Prem Tinsulanonda (26 August 1920 – 26 May 2019) was a Thai military officer, politician, and statesman who served as the Prime Minister of Thailand from 3 March 1980 to 4 August 1988, during which time he was credited with ending a communist insurgency and presiding over accelerating economic growth. As president of the Privy Council, he served as Regent of Thailand from the death of King Bhumibol Adulyadej on 13 October 2016, until the 1 December 2016 proclamation of Vajiralongkorn as King. At the age of 98, Prem was the longest-living Thai Prime Minister. He is also the oldest regent of any country, surpassing Bavarian Prince Regent Luitpold's record, when he became the regent for king Rama X. During the Thai political crisis of the mid-2000s, he was accused by deposed prime minister Thaksin Shinawatra and his supporters of masterminding the 2006 coup, as well as in the appointment of the post-coup legislature and interim government of Surayud Chulanont. The military junta that ousted Thaksin denied that Prem had any important political role. Prem, as the President of the Privy Council, promoted King Bhumibol's ideologies and royal projects, though he sometimes represented himself as being the voice of the king. He urged Thai society to follow the king's advice and himself founded several welfare projects related to education, drug suppression, poverty, and national unity. A southerner, Prem had also dealt personally with trying to resolve the South Thailand insurgency.

Education, military, and political career

Born in Songkhla Province in south Thailand, Prem was the son of Luang Winittantagum (Bueng Tinsulanonda) and Odd Tinsulanonda and had seven siblings. His father was the warden of Songkhla prison, and Prem jokingly claimed to have spent most of his childhood in prison. Prem attended Maha Vajiravudh Secondary School in Songkhla, followed by Suankularb Wittayalai School in Bangkok. He entered the Royal Thai Army Academy (now Chulachomklao Royal Military Academy) in 1941. A distinguished army officer, he entered politics in 1959, as a member of the Constitution Drafting Committee. From 1968 to 1971 he was a Senator, in 1972–73 was a Member of Parliament, and in 1976 was appointed to the Advisory Council of Prime Minister Thanin Kraivichien. Under Prime Minister Kriangsak Chamanan, he was Deputy Interior Minister in 1977–78 and Minister of Defence from 1979 to 1986.

General Prem is known for initiating the negotiations with the members of the Communist Party of Thailand. Consequently, an amnesty was declared and many communist members — including former student protesters — returned home. This helped end the fighting between the government and communist guerrillas in the 1980s.

Prime Minister of Thailand (1980–88)
After Kriangsak retired in 1980, Prem was chosen as Prime Minister. Prem led three administrations and often shifted coalition partners.
 42nd Administration (13 March 1980 – 19 March 1983)
 1st Cabinet (3 March 1980 – 11 March 1981)
 Coalition partners: Social Action Party, Chart Thai, Democrat, Chart Prachachon and Siam Democrat
 Major opposition: Thai Citizens' Party
 2nd Prem Cabinet (11 March 1981 – 8 December 1981)
 Coalition Partners: Democrat, Chart Thai and a number of smaller parties including Siam Democrat, Ruam Thai and Social Democrat
 Major opposition: Social Action and Prachakorn Thai
 3rd Prem Cabinet (9 Dec 1981 – 30 April 1983)
 Coalition Partners: Social Action, Democrat, Chart Thai and a number of smaller parties
 Major opposition: Prachakorn Thai
 43rd Administration (30 April 1983 – 5 August 1986)
 4th Prem Cabinet (30 April 1983 – 11 August 1986)
 Coalition partners: Social Action, Democrat, Prachakorn Thai and National Democrat (replaced by the Progressive party in Sept. 1985)
 Major opposition: Chart Thai
 44th Administration (5 August 1986 – 28 April 1988)
 5th Prem Cabinet (11 August 1986 – 28 April 1988)
 Coalition partners: Democrat, Chart Thai, Social Action, Rasadorn
 Major opposition: Prachakorn Thai, United Democratic, Ruam Thai, Community Action, Progressive

Overcoming coup attempts
From 1–3 April 1981, a group of army colonels known as "The Young Turks" launched a coup attempt in Bangkok. Prem escorted the King and Queen to Nakhon Ratchasima, and began negotiating with the coup leaders. On 3 April, major leaders agreed to end their "April Fool's Day" coup attempt. Some were allowed to take refuge abroad.

Another coup attempt took place on 9 September 1985. Its leaders had been involved in the previous coup four years earlier. The attempt became violent when rebel soldiers fired at the government's information centres, killing an Australian journalist and his American sound man. The coup attempt was supported by Ekkayuth Anchanbutr, a businessman who had fled the country after Prem's government issued new legislation against financial crime. By late afternoon of the same day, the rebels surrendered to the government. Most of its leaders, including Ekayuth, fled abroad.

Assassination attempts
Prem was the target of at least four assassination attempts in 1982. The investigation implicated military officers who were among the 1981 coup's leaders and former communists who opposed Prem's amnesty policy. This became one of the pretexts claimed by the coup leaders of 1991.

Negotiation with communist insurgents

Communist insurgents in Thailand, mainly led by the Communist Party of Thailand, began their armed struggle in the 1960s. After the crackdown of a students' rally at Thammasat University in October 1976, communist activities in the countryside in the northeast of the country increased as students field to join with the party. In the 1980s, Prem began changing his policy towards the communist insurgents. Previously Prem sent his men to China, persuading it to stop supporting the Communist Party of Thailand. China agreed. Prem's new policy offered amnesty to all insurgents, legally called "the communist terrorists". As a result, thousands of former students who had fled to the jungle left the communist strongholds.

Privy councillor and statesman (1988–2019)

Due to political unrest in 1988, Prem dissolved parliament and called for a general election. Following the election, leaders of the winning political parties asked Prem to continue his premiership, but Prem stepped down. Consequently, Chatichai Choonhavan, head of Chart Thai Party, was chosen to be the new prime minister.

On 29 August 1988, Prem received honored as a statesman by being the second person from Pridi Banomyong.

On 4 September 1998, Prem was appointed to head King Bhumibol Adulyadej's Privy Council, becoming the successor to Sanya Dharmasakti.

During the Black May, bloody political crisis in May 1992, Prem was said to have played a crucial role in ending the military suppression of the demonstrations, consulting with King Bhumibol to end the violence and bloodshed.

March 2006 blast: Prem-Thaksin antagonism
Prem's conflicts with Thaksin's government were apparent from 2005, although he had never mentioned Thaksin. Prem, still influential with the armed forces, became a critic of Thaksin's choice of military commanders, especially when Thaksin named his first cousin, general Chaiyasith Shinawatra, as army chief. Thaksin and his supporters immediately reacted against what they called an "out of constitutional" individual (Prem) "meddling" in Thai politics.

Amid the tensions between Thaksin and an "unconstitutional figure", on 9 March 2006, a small bomb exploded outside Prem's residence in Bangkok. Two people were slightly injured, including a passing British tourist. Police said the device had been hidden beneath a stone bench near an unoccupied security booth at the entrance to the residence. The guards were inside the residence at the time. Three cars parked nearby were damaged by the blast. Prime Minister Thaksin Shinawatra denied being involved in the attack.

Role in political crisis and 2006 coup
Prem found himself a leading player in the Thailand political crisis of 2005-2006. In a number of public lectures, he had criticised the attempts of politicians to tighten their grip on the army, urging the public to resist corruption and vested interests. Some commentators inferred that Prem was criticizing Prime Minister Thaksin Shinawatra and his administration.

In June 2006, Thaksin gave a controversial speech to officials claiming "the intervention of an extra-constitutional power, or figure" was seeking to damage his government. Thaksin's supporters presumed Prem was that figure, though Thaksin himself mentioned no names.

Following the September 2006 military coup, Thaksin's supporters blamed Prem, whom they decided must have been the mastermind behind the coup against Thaksin. Prem did help secure the appointment of Surayud Chulanont, another member of the King's Privy Council, as Premier, and allegedly had a say in the appointment of Surayud's Cabinet. Critics claimed the cabinet was full of "Prem's boys".

In an interview published in early-2006, Prem explained his vision of a distinctive Thai-style democracy in which the monarch remains the ultimate defender of the public interest and retains control of the armed forces. Prem used an equestrian metaphor to describe the relative roles of monarch, prime minister, and the army: "In horse racing they have the stable and the owner of the stable owns the horse. The jockey comes and rides the horse during the race, but the jockey does not own the horse. It's very easy [to comprehend]."

The issue of Prem's responsibility for the coup and the subsequent junta has been hotly contested. A ruling Military Council spokesman stated that Prem was not behind the coup. Thai police Lieutenant-General Theeradech Rodphot-hong, head of the Special Branch, cautioned that any legal proceedings would be improper as these could involve the king in a political conflict. He also urged the activists to drop their campaign as it could create conflict within the country.

On 22 July 2007, thousands of protesters, mostly Thaksin supporters, demonstrated in front of Prem's house, calling for him to resign. When the demonstration exploded into violence, police cracked down and arrested several protest leaders, including an interim National Human Rights Commissioner and a former judge, both being former members of deposed prime minister Thaksin's political party. Afterwards, junta chief Sonthi Boonyaratklin visited Prem to apologize for the protests on behalf of the government. A day later, Prime Minister Surayud Chulanont, along with 34 members of his Cabinet, went to Prem's house to apologize to Prem for failing to ensure peace. Surayud accused the protestors of trying to bring down the highest institution of the country. Government spokesman Yongyuth Mayalap said Prem categorically denied the protestors' allegations that he was behind the military coup. According to Yongyuth, Prem said that the charges were repetitive, baseless and provocative.

Prem considered taking legal action against the pro-Thai Rak Thai United Front for Democracy against Dictatorship for defamation. A source close to him said Gen Prem compiled evidence and might file defamation charges against nine key anti-coup figures. Prem continued to wield considerable influence over the military. Interior Minister Aree Wongarya and his deputy, Banyat Chansena, held talks with Prem at his residence on 1 August 2007. During the meeting, Prem gave advice on resolving the South Thailand insurgency and on providing assistance for family members of the victims in accordance with the government's Sarn Jai Thai Su Jai Tai campaign.

In summing up Prem's legacy, a Nation editorial entitled, "Prem was no friend of the people", wrote that, "Prem's legacy will be to inspire military top brass to maintain their strong influence in politics, to the diminishment of democracy in Thailand."

Prem and April 2009 protest of Thaksin's supporters

Before and during the mass protests of Thaksin's supporters, the UDD, Thaksin started mentioning Prem's name publicly. Prem did not respond to these attacks.

Regency (2016)
Upon the death of King Bhumibol Adulyadej, Prem, at age 96, became regent of Thailand as Crown Prince Maha Vajiralongkorn asked for period of mourning before being proclaimed king. For the duration of Prem's regency the Privy Council appointed Thanin Kraivichien as its interim president. At the age of 96, Prem is the oldest regent in the history of any nation.

Personal life
Prem never married and once declared himself to be "married" to the army. Prem's adoptive godson is the commander-in-chief of the Myanmar Armed Forces Min Aung Hlaing, whose father personally knew Prem.

Educational activities
Prem was actively involved in many charities, including the Prem Foundation. He established the Prem Tinsulanonda International School, which opened in August 2001 in Chiang Mai Province.

Death and funeral

Prem died of heart failure at Phramongkutklao Hospital on 26 May 2019, aged 98.

King Vajiralongkorn ordered a period of mourning at the royal court for 21 days from 27 May to 17 June 2019, except for 3 June, which is the birthday of Queen Suthida.

On 8 December 2019, after the corpse was kept in the Song Tham Thorne Hall, Wat Benchamabophit, for 100 days, it was cremated at Wat Debsirindrawas Ratchaworawiharn. King Vajiralongkorn held a royal funeral procession by the Cavalry Division towards Wat Debsirindrawas. King Vajiralongkorn and Queen Suthida, along with Princess Royal Sirindhorn and Princess Bajrakitiyabha, went to the cremation and presided over the funeral ceremony. On 9 December 2019, King Vajiralongkorn sent the acting President of the Privy Council, Surayud Chulanont, as a royal representative to collect the crematory relics at Wat Debsirindrawas.

Tributes and legacy
Thai government builds Tinsulanonda Bridge, located in Mueang Songkhla District and Singhanakhon District by connecting Koh Yo on both sides between the Ban Nam spread Mueang Songkhla District And Ban Khao Kheow, Singhanakhon District. The length of the bridges is 940 meters and 1,700 meters, respectively, for a total of 2,640 meters. People in Songkhla province favor this bridge as "Pa Prem Bridge" "Tin Bridge" or "Prem Bridge" and is considered as one of the famous tourist attractions of the province.

Prem offer to build Prem Tinsulanonda Public Library in front of the 3rd Cavalry Brigade, Prem Tinsulanonda Camp at Nam Phong District, Khon Kaen Province to provide services to people and officers in the 3rd Cavalry Brigade, Prem Tinsulanonda Camp and interested people.

Prem statue located in front of the 2nd Army Military Museum, beside the 2nd Army Headquarters, in Suranaree Camp, Muang District, Nakhon Ratchasima Province. The area beneath the statue has a message that says "Born to repay the land". The signature is written in gold of General Prem Tinsulanonda. Another statue of Prem located at General Prem Tinsulanonda Historical Park, Muang District, Songkhla Province which is his birthplace.

Honours
Prem has received the following decorations and awards in the Honours System of Thailand:
 1988 -  Knight of the Ancient and Auspicious Order of the Nine Gems
 1982 -  Knight Grand Cross (First Class) of the Most Illustrious Order of Chula Chom Klao
 1990 -  Knight Grand Commander (First Class) of the Honourable Order of Rama
 1978 -  Knight Grand Cordon (Special Class) of the Most Exalted Order of the White Elephant
 1975 -  Knight Grand Cordon (Special Class) of the Most Noble Order of the Crown of Thailand
 1996 -  Knight Grand Cross (First Class) of the Most Admirable Order of the Direkgunabhorn
 1988 -  Member of the Order of Symbolic Propitiousness Ramkeerati Boy Scout Citation Medal (Special Class)

Medals
 1941 -  Victory Medal - Franco-Thai War
 1962 -  Victory Medal - World War II
 1978 -  Freemen Safeguarding Medal (First Class)
 1933 -  Safeguarding the Constitution Medal
 1955 -  Chakra Mala Medal (15 years military/police service)
 1982 -  King Rama IX Royal Cypher Medal, 1st Class
 2019 -  King Rama X Royal Cypher Medal, 1st Class
 1980 -  Red Cross Medal of Appreciation

Foreign honours
 :
 Commander Grand Cross of the Royal Order of the Polar Star  (K.m.s.t.k.N.O.) (2003)
 :
 Honorary Grand Commander of the Order of the Defender of the Realm (S.M.N.) (1984)
 Honorary Commander of the Order of the Defender of the Realm (P.M.N.) (1979)
 :
 Knight Grand Cross of the Order of Orange-Nassau(2003)
 :
 Grand Collar of the Order of Sikatuna (G.C.S.)
:
 Grand Cross of the Order of Merit of the Italian Republic (O.M.R.I.)
:
 Grand Cross 1st Class of the Order of Merit of the Federal Republic of Germany (1984)
:
 Grand Gwanghwa Medal of the Order of Diplomatic Service Merit, 1st Class

References

Further reading

External links

 General Prem Tinsulanonda Home Page
Prem Tinsulanonda International School
 News article about his recent activity

|-

|-

|-

|-

Prem Tinsulanonda
Prem Tinsulanonda
Prem Tinsulanonda
Prem Tinsulanonda
Prem Tinsulanonda
Prem Tinsulanonda
Prem Tinsulanonda
Grand Crosses 1st class of the Order of Merit of the Federal Republic of Germany
Prem Tinsulanonda
Prem Tinsulanonda
Prem Tinsulanonda
Prem Tinsulanonda
Knights Grand Cross of the Order of Merit of the Italian Republic
Prem Tinsulanonda
1920 births
2019 deaths
Prem Tinsulanonda